Vic Preston Jr (20 November 1950 – 15 March 2022) was a former rally driver from Kenya. His career spanned from 1966 to 1990.

References

External links
Vic Preston jr. rally profile, eWRC-Results.com

Kenyan rally drivers
Living people
1950 births

Audi Sport drivers
Nismo drivers
World Rally Championship drivers